Aftab Alam is the name of:
 Aftab Alam (judge) (born 1948), Indian judge
 Aftab Alam (cricketer) (born 1992), Afghan cricketer
 Aftab Alam (Pakistani cricketer) (born 1984), Pakistani cricketer
 Aftab Alam, a Pakistani journalist killed in 2015